Vanaküla is a village in Kuusalu Parish, Harju County in northern Estonia. It lies on the left bank of the Valgejõgi River.

References

Villages in Harju County